Alan Gelhorn Fialho (born 1 February 1993) is a Brazilian-Polish professional footballer who plays as a central defender.

Early life

Fialho was born in Rio de Janeiro.

Playing career

Club
Fialho has had two stints in Poland, one with Legia Warsaw and the other with Arka Gdynia. In 2016, Fialho was linked to a move to FC Ashdod in Israel as he qualifies for Israeli citizenship.

International
With ownership of a Polish passport, Fialho was called up to the Polish national under-20 team but was released because he does not speak Polish.

Honours

Club 
 Arka Gdynia
 I liga: 2016

References 

1993 births
Living people
Brazilian footballers
Brazilian people of Polish descent
Association football defenders
Fluminense FC players
Legia Warsaw players
Arka Gdynia players
Expatriate footballers in Poland
Volta Redonda FC players
Footballers from Rio de Janeiro (city)